Eungboksan is a mountain in the counties of Yangyang and Hongcheon, Gangwon-do, in South Korea.

See also
List of mountains in Korea

Notes

References

Mountains of Gangwon Province, South Korea
Yangyang County
Hongcheon County
Mountains of South Korea
One-thousanders of South Korea